The Fierza Hydroelectric Power Station is a large hydroelectric power station on the Drin River, in Albania.

Fierza is the upper HPP (Hydro Power Plant) of the Drin River cascade. Based on the installed power capacity, position and the volume of the reservoir, Fierza plays a key role for the exploitation, regulation and safe operation of Drin cascade.

Work for its construction began in 1970. The first power unit became operational in 1978 and the plant was fully operational in 1980. Fierza HPP was built with equipment mostly from China but on the concepts of Albanian engineers. Around 14,000 workers, engineers and specialist were involved in the construction of the plant.

Fierza is a HPP with a Rock-fill dam with a clay core and reservoir. When it was built, Fierza was the second in Europe for the height of its type. The dam has a total volume of 8 million m3.

Construction began in 1971 and was completed seven years later in 1978. The dam is one of the three hydroelectric dams on the Drin River. The reservoir was filled with water between 1978 and 1981.

The four units installed in the plant have "Francis" vertical turbines with 125 MW power each; 3-Phase synchronous generators of 13.8kV voltage; and lifting transformers 13.8kV/242 kV for the connection with the transmission substation.

The annual output of Fierza HPP averages in 1,330 GWh, that represent approximately 33% of Drin cascade production.

The importance of Fierza, beside energy production, relates on the capacity of its lake which regulates the annual inflows and increase the efficient use of the Drin cascade.

See also 

Koman and Fierza Reservoirs Ferry
 List of power stations in Albania

References 

Hydroelectric power stations in Albania
Dams completed in 1979
Buildings and structures in Kukës County